Hefeng County is a county on the upper reaches of the Loushui River in the southwestern part of Hubei province, People's Republic of China, bordering Hunan province to the south. It is under the administration of the Enshi Tujia and Miao Autonomous Prefecture.

Administrative Divisions
Five towns:
Zouma, Rongmei, Taiping (before 2013 Taiping Township ), Yanzi (before 2013 Yanzi Township ), Zhongying (before 2013 Zhongying Township )

Four townships:
Tielu Township, Wuli Township, Xiaping Township, Wuyang Township

Climate

Economy
 Jiangpinghe Dam, near Jiangpinghe Village, Zouma Town

References

Counties of Hubei
Enshi Tujia and Miao Autonomous Prefecture